Friedrich St. Florian (born 1932) is an Austrian-American architect. He moved to the United States in 1961, and became a naturalized U.S. citizen in 1973.

Early life and education
St. Florian was born Friedrich St. Florian Gartler in the Austrian city of Graz. He has been quoted a saying "When I was 10 or 11, I was a sandcastle-builder, a dam-builder. I wanted to build for the pleasure, the delight of it really was amazing."

St. Florian studied Architecture at the Graz University of Technology, where he graduated in 1960. He then won a Fulbright Fellowship which allowed him to move to the United and study at Columbia University where he earned an additional MS.

Academic career
After teaching at Columbia University for a year, St. Florian joined the Rhode Island School of Design faculty in 1963, where he helped launch the school’s European Honors Program in Rome, which he directed from 1965-67. From 1978-88 he was dean of Architectural Studies and acted as Provost for Academic Affairs from 1981-84.

He has also taught at the Architectural Association School of Architecture, London, England; the M.I.T, Cambridge, Massachusetts, USA; McGill University in Montreal, Quebec, Canada; the University of Texas at Austin in Austin, Texas, USA and the University of Utah, USA.

Professional career

St. Florian has been a practicing architect in the United States since 1974. His work is included in numerous private collections as well as in the permanent collection of the Museum of Modern Art in New York City, the M.I.T, the RISD Museum and the Centre Georges Pompidou, Paris, France. He also won the second prize for his design with Raimund Abraham and John Thornley for the last of these.

With Abraham he also won the first prize (ex aequo) in the international architectural design competition for the "Cultural Center" in Leopoldville, Congo in 1959 which was not built and the third prize in the 1958 competition for the Pan Arabian University, Riyadh, Saudi Arabia

He served as Project Architect for Providence Place, a 450 million-dollar regional retail and entertainment center located in historic downtown Providence, Rhode Island and the largest construction project ever undertaken in Rhode Island, and the Providence Skybridge, which frames the entrance to the city.

His most prestigious project  is probably the design of the National World War II Memorial in Washington, D.C., U.S., which he won against 400 entries in 1997.

St. Florian's office is currently headquartered in downtown Providence, Rhode Island.  He continues to work on international design competitions and a wide array of projects.  Recent built works include a modernist residence in Providence's East Side and Urban Markers in Charlotte, North Carolina.  The project named "Three Pier Bridge" was designed under a new firm name "Studio Providence LLC", which is a collaboration between St.Florian's firm and 3SIX0 Architecture.  The "Three Pier Bridge" tied for first place in an international competition while also winning prizes from the BSA and AIA.

He is inspired by Louis Kahn, Mies van der Rohe, le Corbusier and Frank Lloyd Wright. "Mies van der Rohe held the Chair of the Illinois Institute of Technology in Chicago when I visited him. I felt like a pilgrim. His office was wide open, there were no doors. He was very curious to get news from Austria."

References

External links
Friedrich St.Florian's website
"An Academic Touches the Masses With War Memorial" on New York Times
"The Way We Live Now: Questions for Friedrich St.Florian; The Greatest Veneration" on New York Times
"An Appraisal; New War Memorial Is Shrine to Sentiment" on New York Times
"House on College Hill" on ArchDaily
"Tryon Bridge Beacons Beckon" in Inform Magazine 
"Three Pier Bridge" on ArchDaily
St. Florian retrospective at Brown University
 St. Florian, MoMA collection
St. Florian's R.I.S.D faculty profile
St. Florian on American Architects
A list of St. Florian's projects

1932 births
Living people
Columbia Graduate School of Architecture, Planning and Preservation alumni
American architects
Austrian architects
Rhode Island School of Design faculty
University of Utah faculty